This is a list of theaters in Omaha, Nebraska.  The entries include theaters used to present films and professional live performances, including vaudeville acts, plays and musical performances.

Introduction

Live performance theaters 

In 1860, the dining room of the Herndon House hosted for the first dramatic performance in Omaha, using a borrowed bolt of muslin for a curtain.   Julia Dean Hayne, a leading actress of the time, played the title role.  These were the humble beginnings of Omaha's performing arts scene.  Today the city is home to the Omaha Community Playhouse, a nationally recognized community theater; the Holland Performing Arts Center; the beloved Orpheum Theater; and a host of other smaller performing arts venues.

Moving picture theaters 

With more than 100 theaters since it was incorporated, Omaha's movie scene has never been static.   Many of the early movie film theaters in Omaha were neighborhood theaters, small store-front establishments seating about 300 people on plain plywood seats.  Most of the patrons of these early theaters walked to them or took street cars, so parking was not an issue.  Larger theaters were congregated in Downtown Omaha, mainly along Douglas Street between Fourteenth and Sixteenth Streets, on what was called Theater Row.  As personal automobile ownership increased, suburban theaters were built, and several drive-in theaters opened on what was then the outskirts of the city.  Today, theater complexes with luxury seating, in-auditorium dining and bar service are prevalent.  Omaha's last drive-in theater closed in 1987.

Current theaters

Theaters of the past

Drive-in theaters

See also 

 History of Omaha
 Theatre in Omaha, Nebraska

References

External links 

 Omaha's Theater Row
 Orpheum Theater Entrance
 Response to Usherette Ad at Paramount Theater
 Chief Theater Entrance
 Alternate View of Chief Theater Entrance
 Historic Dundee Theater Photo
 Dundee Theater Opening
 Historic Photo of Sky-View Drive-In Screen
 Cars Lined Up to Enter Sky-View Drive-In
 Rocky Horror Picture Show at Admiral Theater
 Artist's Rendering of the Cinema Center
 Line into the Cinema Center
 Omaha Movie Times August 24, 1973
 Omaha Area Drive-In Theater Photos
 For Sale Sign at Sky-View Drive-In

Theaters
Theatres in Nebraska
Culture of Omaha, Nebraska
Omaha
Omaha, Nebraska
Theaters in Omaha